S. V. Ramaswamy was an Indian politician and former Member of Parliament elected from Tamil Nadu. He was elected to the Lok Sabha from Salem constituency as an Indian National Congress candidate in 1951,  1957 and 1962 elections.

References 

Indian National Congress politicians from Tamil Nadu
Living people
India MPs 1952–1957
India MPs 1957–1962
India MPs 1962–1967
Lok Sabha members from Tamil Nadu
People from Salem district
Year of birth missing (living people)